The Prince Royal was a 55-gun royal ship of the English Royal Navy.

Design 
The Prince Royal was built by Phineas Pett I at Woolwich and launched in 1610. The ship's fittings were carved by Sebastian Vicars, and painted and gilded by Robert Peake and Paul Isackson between Easter and Michaelmas 1611. Prince Henry took his cousin Frederick Ulrich, Duke of Brunswick-Lüneburg to see the ship being built. Princess Elizabeth sailed on The Prince Royal from Margate to Ostend in April 1613.

She was the first ship of the line with three complete gun decks, although when first completed the upper deck carried no guns in the waist, and was stepped down aft because of the large amount of sheer (the manner in which the decks rose towards the stern and bow). In 1621 a refit saw the removal of this step-down, with all three gun decks now being continuous.

Service 
From 1639 to 1641 the Prince Royal was rebuilt by Peter Pett at Woolwich as a 70-gun first-rate ship. During the time of the Commonwealth of England, she was named Resolution and fought in most battles of the First Anglo-Dutch War. By 1660 she was carrying 80 guns, and with the English Restoration of King Charles II she resumed the name Royal Prince. In 1663 she was rebuilt again at Woolwich Dockyard by Sir Phineas Pett II as a 92-gun first-rate ship of the line.

In 1665, during the Second Anglo-Dutch War, she served as the flagship of Edward Montagu, 1st Earl of Sandwich at the Battle of Lowestoft on 3 June.  A year later in 1666, she was Vice-Admiral George Ayscue's flagship in the Four Days Battle, on the third day of which (3 June by the Julian calendar then used in England) she ran aground on the Galloper Sand. When Dutch fireships surrounded the stranded ship, the crew panicked and Ayscue was forced to surrender to Lieutenant-Admiral Cornelis Tromp who was aboard the Gouda. The Dutch managed to free the ship from the shoal, but found her steering to be irreparably damaged. In accordance with standing orders issued by the States-General of the Netherlands, Lieutenant-Admiral Michiel de Ruyter ordered the Prince Royal to be burned, to prevent her recapture.

See also
, the last three-decked ship of the line commissioned by the Royal Navy.

Notes

References

Lavery, Brian (2003) The Ship of the Line – Volume 1: The development of the battlefleet 1650–1850. Conway Maritime Press. .
Winfield, Rif (2009) British Warships in the Age of Sail 1603–1714: Design, Construction, Careers and Fates. Seaforth Publishing. .

External links
 

Ships of the line of the Royal Navy
Ships built in Woolwich
1610s ships
Maritime incidents in 1666
Ships of the English navy